Who's Foolin' Who is the second compilation by the German hard rock band Bonfire.  It is a greatest hits collection that was released by BMG International in 2000.  The album contains material from Bonfire's first four albums.  The title is from one of the band's songs from the album Point Blank.

Track listing

Band members
(At the time of this release)
Claus Lessmann
Hans Ziller
Chris Lausmann
Uwe Kohler
Jurgen Wiehler

2000 greatest hits albums
Bonfire (band) compilation albums